The 1924 The Citadel Bulldogs football team represented The Citadel, The Military College of South Carolina in the 1924 college football season.  Carl Prause served as head coach for the third season.  The Bulldogs played as members of the Southern Intercollegiate Athletic Association and played home games at College Park Stadium in Hampton Park.  The first Homecoming day was held at The Citadel on October 25, 1924.

Schedule

References

Citadel Bulldogs
The Citadel Bulldogs football seasons
Citadel football